Ecstatic Yod, otherwise known as Father Yod, is a record label run by music critic Byron Coley. In 1993 the label partnered with Thurston Moore's label Ecstatic Peace and began releasing records under the name "Ecstatic Yod." Ecstatic Yod operates a retail outlet in Florence, Massachusetts.

Releases
 2006 - OvO/Smut (split 7”)

See also
 List of record labels

American record labels